Roșia railway station was a station on the Vurpăr branch line of the Agnita railway line in Vurpăr, Sibiu County Romania. The station still exists along with the track which has been protected.

History
The station was built by the Hungarian State Railways in 1910 who operated it until 1919 when Transylvania became part of Romania. After a decline in usage across the whole line the route eventually closed in 1993.

Future
Plans exist to reopen part of the line after it was protected in 2008. The local group Asociația Prietenii Mocăniței has taken on the task of restoring the route which has already restored a section of the line.

References

Defunct railway stations in Romania
Former Agnita railway line stations
Railway stations opened in 1910
Railway stations closed in 1993
1910 establishments in Austria-Hungary
1993 disestablishments in Romania